The ACVV, formerly known as the Afrikaanse Christelike Vrouevereniging (English translation: Afrikaner Christian Women's Movement) is a woman's movement in South Africa founded in 1904. It is the oldest welfare organisation in South Africa.

It initially was Afrikaner-centred and conservative. Women's organizations like the ACVV extended their operations beyond the realm of the home and became involved in Afrikaner education, identity and inevitably, politics.

The modern ACVV is multicultural, and the website carries the motto "Together in the Service of the Community" in Afrikaans, Xhosa language Sikunye kwiinkonzo zoluntu, English and Setswana language Re mmogo mo ditirelong tsa loago.

References

External links
 ACVV

Christianity in South Africa
Establishments in Transvaal
1904 in Transvaal
1904 establishments in Africa